"The Brazilian" is an instrumental piece by the English band Genesis that concludes their 1986 album Invisible Touch. The song features experimental sounds and effects.

The band wrote two instrumental pieces for the album, this and "Do the Neurotic". The latter was cut from the album's final track selection.

The tune was featured in the animated movie When the Wind Blows, which was scored by Roger Waters. It was also used in an episode of Magnum, P.I. called "Unfinished Business". The track was also used extensively by the BBC in their TV coverage of the 1987 World Athletics Championships. In 1987 the track received a Grammy Award nomination for Best Pop Instrumental Performance (Orchestra, Group or Soloist).

The song was also featured in the 2020 Hulu film, Palm Springs, during Sarah's quantum physics montage.

Personnel
 Tony Banks – keyboards, synth bass
 Phil Collins – Simmons drums
 Mike Rutherford – electric guitars

References

External links
http://www.rollingstone.com/music/lists/20-insanely-great-genesis-songs-only-hardcore-fans-know-20141010/the-brazilian-20141010

1986 songs
Genesis (band) songs
Rock instrumentals
Songs written by Tony Banks (musician)
Songs written by Phil Collins
Songs written by Mike Rutherford
Song recordings produced by Hugh Padgham